FSJ may refer to:

 Area of freedom, security and justice (AFSJ)
 Football Association of Yugoslavia
 Foreign Service Journal
 Full Size Jeep
 James Fisher & Sons, a British marine engineering firm
 Voluntary social year